Japan's Continental Policy refers to a Pan-Asian strategy pursued by Japan, especially the Imperial Japanese Army, between the Meiji Restoration and Japan's expansion during World War II. The policy's major aim was to conquer Japan's neighboring countries such as Korea and China to dominate East Asia.

Continental Policy before the Meiji Restoration
There were already thoughts about expansion in Japan before the Meiji Restoration. Emperor Jimmu, the first Emperor of Japan, had thoughts of ruling the world. Also, Empress Jingū mentioned conquering Samhan.

In the late 16th century, Toyotomi Hideyoshi finished unifying Japan and he invaded Korea twice. The aim of the attack was to prepare for conquering China in the future. Although he failed in the end, this action symbolized the starting of Japan's expansion.

In the late Tokugawa shogunate, many advisers had thoughts of conquering different lands and setting up colonies. Honda Toshiaki mentioned that Japan should begin conquering the world and become the world's strongest nation to be their ultimate aim. For this, he suggested they occupy Manchuria, Sakhalin, and Kamchatka Peninsula first, and follow the lead of Europe in setting up overseas colonies. Nobuhiro Sato also suggested that the procedure for ruling Asia is to capture Manchuria first, then East Asia, then South Asia. This became the strategy used by Japan in World War II.

Continental Policy after the Meiji Restoration
In the mid-19th century, Japan had been strengthened by the Meiji Restoration and had built a modernized and centralized Japanese government. The Meiji Government greatly encouraged people to help modernize Japan, setting up industrial enterprises and starting their industrial revolution in mid-1880s. Due to many factors affecting Japan, Japan decided to be a military-based country, creating the Continental Policy.

Japan’s plan and actions

Plan
Tanaka Giichi is alleged to have presented the so-called Tanaka Memorial, a plan outlining the procedures of Continental Policy in 1927. According to the presented text, "If we want to conquer the World, we need to conquer China first. If we want to conquer China, we need to conquer Mongolia and Manchuria first. If we want to conquer Mongolia and Manchuria, we need to conquer Korea and Taiwan first." However, in the wake of the countless war crime accusations by the victorious Allies after World War II, intensive searches for a Japanese language original were unsuccessful, and the original document, if it existed at all, has never been found. Furthermore, in 1995, a former NKVD official stated that the document was a forgery created in 1931 by the Soviet Union to sow anti-Japanese sentiment abroad, especially in the United States.

While the Tanaka Memorial has been mentioned in newspapers and school textbooks in China, most Japanese historians contend that the document is a forgery.

Actions

Japan's first modern foreign action was the conquering of Ryukyu by the Satsuma Domain in 1879. However, this was not a part of a wider plan, and was done on the prerogative of the Satsuma Domain. Then, Japan won the First Sino-Japanese War and annexed Taiwan and Penghu in 1895. Following that, Japan built up a puppet state in Korea with the excuse of pacifying the Donghak Peasant Revolution. Japan finally occupied Korea in 1910.

In 1932, Japan captured Manchuria and built the puppet state of Manchukuo. Japan attacked China in 1937 and tried to finish the Continental Policy. But Japan failed to conquer China and lost in World War II, costing Japan all of her overseas land. This also symbolized the end of Japan's expansion and the failure of the Continental Policy.

References

Military doctrines
Foreign relations of the Empire of Japan
Japanese diplomacy